This article lists the winners and nominees for the NAACP Image Award for Outstanding Talk Series. The award was created during the 2008 ceremony after being separated from the Outstanding News/Information – Series or Special category. Currently Red Table Talk, Steve Harvey and The View hold the record for most wins in this category with three each.

Winners and nominees
Winners are listed first and highlighted in bold.

2000s
{| class="wikitable" style="width:100%;"
|- style="background:#bebebe;"
! style="width:11%;"| Year
! style="width:84%;"| Series
! style="width:5%;"| Ref
|-
| rowspan="6" align="center"| 2008
|- style="background:#B0C4DE"
| Tavis Smiley| rowspan="6" align="center"| 
|-
| Judge Mathis|-
| Our World with Black Enterprise|-
| Real Time with Bill Maher|-
| The Tyra Banks Show|-
| rowspan="6" align="center"| 2009
|- style="background:#B0C4DE"
| The View'| rowspan="6" align="center"| 
|-
| Iconoclasts|-
| Judge Mathis|-
| Tavis Smiley|-
| The Tyra Banks Show|}

2010s

2020s

Multiple wins and nominations
Wins

 3 wins
 Red Table Talk Steve Harvey The View 2 wins
 The RealNominations

 9 nominations
 The View 5 nominations
 The Daily Show with Trevor Noah The Real 4 nominations
 Red Table Talk Steve Harvey 3 nominations
 Oprah's Lifeclass Tamron Hall The Tyra Banks Show The Wendy Williams Show 2 nominations
 Judge Mathis Tavis Smiley Oprah's Next Chapter The Mo'Nique Show The Oprah Winfrey Show The Queen Latifah Show The Shop: Uninterrupted The Talk''

References

NAACP Image Awards